Dilofo or Dilofos (Greek meaning two hills), may refer to several places in Greece:

Dilofos, a village in the Evros regional unit
Dilofo, Ioannina, a village in the Ioannina regional unit, in the municipal unit Central Zagori
Dilofo, Kozani, a village in the Kozani regional unit
Dilofo, Larissa, a village in the Larissa regional unit, in the municipal unit Nikaia